Chênaie-des-Îles-Finlay Ecological Reserve is an ecological reserve of Quebec, Canada. It was established on

References

External links
 Official website from Government of Québec

Nature reserves in Outaouais
Protected areas established in 2007
2007 establishments in Quebec